Gustavo Culma (born 20 April 1993) is a Colombian footballer who plays as a winger, he last played for Correcaminos.

Career
Culma began his career with Once Caldas. On 15 January 2016, he joined Bulgarian side Litex Lovech. In January 2018 Culma signed with Club Necaxa that plays in the Mexican Liga MX.

Statistics

Honours

Club
Necaxa
Copa MX: Clausura 2018

References

External links
 

1993 births
Living people
Colombian footballers
Colombian expatriate footballers
Once Caldas footballers
PFC Litex Lovech players
PFC CSKA Sofia players
Club Necaxa footballers
First Professional Football League (Bulgaria) players
Liga MX players
Expatriate footballers in Bulgaria
Expatriate footballers in Mexico
Association football wingers